Stalybridge railway station serves Stalybridge, Greater Manchester, England. The station is managed by TransPennine Express.

History 

Stalybridge station was built by the Sheffield, Ashton-under-Lyne and Manchester Railway and opened on 23 December 1845. There was a Lancashire and Yorkshire Railway station adjacent, which acted as the terminus of that company's line from Manchester Victoria but this closed in 1917. The main function of the station was as a junction for the Stockport-Stalybridge Line, which allowed passengers from London and the South to transfer to the Huddersfield Line. This role has been lost since it is now possible for passengers to change at Manchester Piccadilly. The Micklehurst Loop also diverged from the original 1849 Huddersfield & Manchester main line here - it was closed in October 1966, but the disused tunnel it used to pass below the town's northern suburbs can be seen alongside the original one that is still used today by trains heading to and from Yorkshire.

Facilities 

The station has an entrance block with a ticket office. Ramps and a passenger subway lead up to the platforms. The station is one of very few to retain its original buffet, the 1998 refurbishment of which won awards from CAMRA and English Heritage. At the 2008 Tameside food and drink festival it was voted best bar.

Following further refurbishment in 2012 Lord Pendry of Stalybridge, who often uses the buffet bar and contributed over half of the £6,000 costs, unveiled a plaque to mark the works.

Michael Portillo visited the buffet bar in "Manchester Piccadilly to Silkstone Common", a 2017 episode of Great British Railway Journeys.

In a £1.5m overhaul of the station, which began in 2007, the platforms were raised and the toilets, information services and shelters on the westbound platform were improved. In December 2008 the new entrance was completed.

Recent developments

Further work to expand the station was completed in 2012 - this saw major alterations to the track layout (including the opening of two new platforms) and signalling, with control of the latter passing to the Manchester East signalling centre at Stockport. The two new platforms were opened on 5 November 2012; the former platform 1 was renumbered 4, and a new bay on the northern side is Platform 5.

An Access for All scheme, funded by the Department for Transport, gave easier access to all of the platforms. Lifts were built to give step-free access to the entire station, though the station had no steps previously as there were ramps to all platforms.

Services

TransPennine Express

A major change in calling pattern was implemented at the May 2018 timetable change, though the base 30-minute service frequency remained unchanged. Eastbound departures will now serve the intermediate stations on a "skip-stop" pattern en route to Huddersfield and Leeds (replacing the former Northern local service), with alternate trains continuing to Hull. Westbound trains will now all terminate at Manchester Piccadilly, with no regular service to Manchester Victoria and Liverpool (though connections will still be available at Piccadilly).

Northern Trains
Since the May 2018 timetable change, all Northern Trains trains from Manchester Victoria now start and terminate here.

An hourly service runs on Sundays.

The "parliamentary service" from Stockport 

A parliamentary train still travels along the whole Stockport-Stalybridge Line, which for many years was in one direction only and with no return service. An attempt was made to close the line to passenger services in the early 1990s (the service having been drastically cut in May 1989 after the re-routing of TransPennine Express services from Manchester Victoria to Manchester Piccadilly), but closure was refused by the Department of Transport which ordered that a regular service continue. The train ran on a Friday as the 09:22 Stockport to Stalybridge; however, from the start of the summer 2018 timetable, the service shifted to Saturday and operates in both directions. The new southbound train left at 08:46 for Stockport and returns from there at 09:45, arriving back at Stalybridge around 20 minutes later.

References

External links 

Railway stations in Tameside
DfT Category D stations
Former Great Central Railway stations
Former London and North Western Railway stations
Railway stations in Great Britain opened in 1845
Railway stations served by TransPennine Express
Northern franchise railway stations
Railway station